The dancesport competition at the 2017 World Games took place from July 28 to July 29, in Wrocław in Poland, at the Centennial Hall.

Participating nations

Medal table

Events

References

External links
 The World Games 2017
 Result Book (Archived version)

2017 World Games
2017